Baziège is a commune in the Haute-Garonne department in southwestern France. Baziège station has rail connections to Toulouse, Carcassonne and Narbonne.

Population

Monument

See also
Communes of the Haute-Garonne department

References

External links

Official site

Communes of Haute-Garonne